Manuel Pradal (22 March 1964 – 13 May 2017) was a French film director and screenwriter. He wrote the scenarios for all the films he directed. Pradal died on 13 May 2017 in Paris after a long illness, aged 53.

Awards and nominations 
His 1997 film Marie from the Bay of Angels was in competition for the Tiger Award at the 1998 International Film Festival Rotterdam (IFFR).

Filmography 
Manuel Pradal is both the screenwriter and the director of all of his films.
 1991: Canti
 1997: Marie from the Bay of Angels (a.k.a. Angel Sharks)
 2002: Ginostra
 2006: A Crime
 2010: The Blonde with Bare Breasts
 2013: Tom le cancre
 2014: Benoît Brisefer: Les Taxis rouges

References

External links 
 

French film directors
French screenwriters
1964 births
People from Aubenas
2017 deaths